Christopher Sydney Carter (born 25 December 1942) is a British middle-distance runner. He competed in the 800 metres at the 1964 Summer Olympics and the 1968 Summer Olympics.

He also represented England in the 880 yards, at the 1966 British Empire and Commonwealth Games in Kingston, Jamaica.

References

1942 births
Living people
Athletes (track and field) at the 1964 Summer Olympics
Athletes (track and field) at the 1968 Summer Olympics
British male middle-distance runners
Olympic athletes of Great Britain
Athletes (track and field) at the 1966 British Empire and Commonwealth Games
Commonwealth Games competitors for England